The 2004 Tropicana 400 presented by Meijer was the 18th stock car race of the 2004 NASCAR Nextel Cup Series season and the 4th iteration of the event. The race was held on Sunday, July 11, 2004, before a crowd of 80,000 in Joliet, Illinois, at Chicagoland Speedway, a 1.5 miles (2.41 km) tri-oval speedway. The race took the scheduled 267 laps to complete. At race's end, Tony Stewart of Joe Gibbs Racing would win a controversial race, after an altercation with Evernham Motorsports driver Kasey Kahne left owner Ray Evernham accusing Stewart of numerous occasions of reckless driving and stating that "He needs to get suspended, and he should have his ass beat." The win was Stewart's 18th career NASCAR Nextel Cup Series win and his first of the season. To fill out the podium, Jimmie Johnson of Hendrick Motorsports and Dale Jarrett of Robert Yates Racing would finish second and third, respectively.

Background 

Chicagoland Speedway is a 1.5 miles (2.41 km) tri-oval speedway in Joliet, Illinois, southwest of Chicago. The speedway opened in 2001 and currently hosts NASCAR racing. Until 2011, the speedway also hosted the IndyCar Series, recording numerous close finishes including the closest finish in IndyCar history. The speedway is owned and operated by International Speedway Corporation and located adjacent to Route 66 Raceway.

Entry list

Practice

First practice 
The first practice session would occur on Friday, July 9, at 11:20 AM CST, and would last for two hours.

Second practice 
The second practice session would occur on Saturday, July 10, at 8:30 AM CST, and would last for 45 minutes.

Third and final practice 
The third and final practice session, sometimes referred to as Happy Hour, would occur on Saturday, July 10, at 11:10 AM CST, and would last for 45 minutes.

Qualifying 
Qualifying would take occur on Friday, July 9, at 3:10 PM CST. Each driver would have two laps to set a fastest time; the fastest of the two would count as their official qualifying lap. Positions 1-38 would be decided on time, while positions 39-43 would be based on provisionals. Four spots are awarded by the use of provisionals based on owner's points. The fifth is awarded to a past champion who has not otherwise qualified for the race. If no past champ needs the provisional, the next team in the owner points will be awarded a provisional.

Full qualifying results

Race 
Pole sitter Jeff Gordon led the first lap of the race. On lap 15, rookie Kasey Kahne took the lead from Gordon. On lap 18, the first caution flew when Ryan Newman and Kurt Busch crashed in turn 2. Tony Stewart was the leader of the race on the restart. On that restart, rookie Brendan Gaughan's car began smoking. The caution flew to check for oil. Gaughan had actually broken a trackbar and the race was back underway on lap 30. On lap 39, the third caution came out for debris laying all over the backstretch with drivers like Matt Kenseth and Kevin Harvick running over the debris. After the longest green flag run of 78 laps, the fourth caution came out when Ricky Craven's engine blew. Kasey Kahne won the race off of pit road and was the race leader. But on the restart, chaos would ensue. On the restart, Tony Stewart jumped to the outside of Sterling Marlin. Stewart then got on Kahne's back bumper when Kahne's car got loose and crashed into the outside wall causing an 8 car wreck in turn 1. The cars involved were Kahne, Stewart, John Andretti, Dale Earnhardt Jr., Scott Riggs, Jeff Gordon, Dave Blaney, and Jeff Burton. On pit road, Kahne's crew chief Tommy Baldwin Jr. and his crew went over to talk to Tony Stewart's crew chief Greg Zipadelli when a big fight occurred on pit road between Baldwin and Zipadelli with the crews getting in the middle of it. The race got back going again on lap 135 with Stewart as the leader. On lap 172, the 6th caution came out for debris. On lap 181, Jimmie Johnson took the lead from Stewart. On lap 209, the 7th caution would fly when Mike Bliss crashed off of turn 2. Jeremy Mayfield would be the race leader on the restart. On lap 241, Stewart would pass Mayfield for the race lead. With 23 to go, the 8th caution flew for debris in turn 4. With 15 to go, The 9th and final caution flew when Robby Gordon spun Jeff Green in turn 3. On the restart with 11 to go, Stewart took the lead and took the win for his first win of 2004. Jimmie Johnson, Dale Jarrett, Jeff Gordon, and Jeremy Mayfield rounded out the top 5 while Terry Labonte, Sterling Marlin, Joe Nemechek, Michael Waltrip, and Kevin Harvick rounded out the top 10.

Race results

References 

2004 NASCAR Nextel Cup Series
NASCAR races at Chicagoland Speedway
July 2004 sports events in the United States
2004 in sports in Illinois